The Bréguet Br 960 Vultur was a prototype two-seat carrier-based attack and anti-submarine aircraft (ASW) built for the French Navy (Marine Nationale) during the early 1950s. Meeting contradictory endurance and speed requirements, it was designed as a "mixed-power" aircraft with a turboprop engine in the front and a turbojet in the rear. Only two examples were built, but the second aircraft was rebuilt as the prototype of the Bréguet 1050 Alizé ASW aircraft after the Navy dropped the idea of a turboprop attack aircraft in the mid-1950s.

Design and development
On 12 November 1947, Naval Aviation (Aéronavale) issued a specification for a carrier-based attack and anti-submarine aircraft capable of carrying bombs, depth charges, guided missiles, rockets and torpedoes and using rockets to assist its take off.

Bréguet recognized that the speed requirements were contradictory and could only be met by a mixed-power design that combined a diminutive Armstrong Siddeley Mamba turboprop in the nose with a Rolls-Royce Nene turbojet in the tail. The Br 960 Vultur ("Vulture") was a low-wing monoplane with an oval-shaped monocoque fuselage and tricycle landing gear. Its two-spar wing featured a swept leading edge and a straight trailing edge which used hydraulic mechanisms to fold vertically. The tailplane was similarly swept and had 16° of dihedral. There was a  self-sealing fuel tank in the fuselage and a  self-sealing tank in each outer wing panel. The aircraft accommodated a pilot and copilot sitting side-by-side in a framed canopy.

The first prototype was fitted with a  Mamba I engine and a  Nene 101 turbojet which had its air supplied by ducts in the wing roots. The aircraft made its first flight on 4 August 1951 and proved to be very underpowered, so much so that it could not be flown at full load without the Nene running. The second prototype incorporated modifications that addressed some of the problems revealed by the flight testing of the earlier aircraft. Installed on its wingtips were small nacelles; the port one contained a  unprotected fuel tank while the starboard nacelle housed an attack radar. The first prototype proved to have poor flying characteristics, but the second aircraft met all of the requirements of the specifications and demonstrated satisfactory carrier catapulting and landing qualities at the Royal Aircraft Establishment's facility at Farnborough Airfield in early 1953 (no French facility was equipped to evaluate those things at that time). Both aircraft gave no warning of an impending stall. The first prototype was later modified to test engine air blown through slots in the upper surface of the wing intended to improve lift as the Br 963.

The aircraft was fitted with a single hardpoint below the fuselage that could carry a 1,000 kg (2,200 lb) payload. Under the wings were four launchers that could carry two rockets apiece. In addition to bombs, the under-fuselage hardpoint was equipped to carry a more powerful search radar in a container.

When Aéronavale lost interest in a turboprop attack aircraft in 1953–1954, but was keen to purchase a new dedicated anti-submarine warfare platform, Bréguet modified the second prototype as a proof-of-concept demonstrator. The Nene was removed and its tailpipe was blanked off while the turboprop was upgraded to a more powerful Mamba VI model. A retractable AN/APS-15 search radar was installed in the fuselage while both wingtip nacelles were removed. Additional fuel tanks replaced the engine air ducts and wheel wells in the inner wing sections and the landing gear was modified to retract forward into large nacelles on the wing leading edges. Now known as the Br 965 Épaulard  ("Killer Whale"), it made its first flight on 26 March 1956 and was the immediate forerunner of the Bréguet 1050 Alizé. It continued to fly until it had a landing accident on 2 May after which it was used as a source of spares of the first prototype.

Variants

Br 960 
Two prototypes built.
Br 960F1 
Bréguet proposal for an aerial "hunter/killer" model much like the American Grumman AF Guardian, with one version only equipped with a surface-search radar and the other had an enlarged bomb bay for more weapons. Reverted to a conventional landing gear to save weight.
Br 960F2
Similar to the F1, but retained the tricycle landing gear.
Br 961
"De-navalized" single-seat version proposed for the French Air Force (Armée de l'Air) with one  autocannon in each wing.
Br 962 
Proposed version of the Br 961 with a wing with more sweep and a more powerful engine.
Br 962 ASW
Design with an enlarged cabin, a single Mamba VI engine and an AS 33B radar in the left wingtip nacelle.
Br 963
The first prototype modified to conduct tests with a circulation control wing.
Br 965 Épaulard
The second prototype rebuilt for the ASW role and served as the prototype of the Bréguet Alizé.

Specifications (Br.960, second prototype)

See also

Notes

References

Further reading

External links

"A Visitor from France" a 1953 Flight article

 0960
Carrier-based aircraft
1950s French attack aircraft
Mixed-power aircraft
Single-engined tractor aircraft
Low-wing aircraft
Aircraft first flown in 1951